Toledo Rockets basketball may refer to either of the basketball teams that represent the University of Toledo:

Toledo Rockets men's basketball
Toledo Rockets women's basketball